Limnocythere is a genus of ostracod crustaceans in the family Limnocytheridae. It contains the following extant species :

Limnocythere bradburyi Forester, 1985
Limnocythere camera Delorme, 1967
Limnocythere ceriotuberosa (Delorme, 1967)
Limnocythere floridensis Keyser, 1976
Limnocythere friabilis Benson & MacDonald, 1963
Limnocythere glypta Dobbin, 1941
Limnocythere herricki Staplin, 1963
Limnocythere hungarica Daday, 1900
Limnocythere illinoisensis Sharpe, 1897
Limnocythere inopinata (Baird, 1843)
Limnocythere iowensis Danforth, 1948
Limnocythere itasca Cole, 1949
Limnocythere liporeticulata Delorme, 1968
Limnocythere ornata Furtos, 1933
Limnocythere oughtoni Tressler, 1957
Limnocythere paraornata Delorme, 1971
Limnocythere parascutariensis Delorme, 1971
Limnocythere platyforma Delorme, 1971
Limnocythere porphyretica De Deckker, 1981
Limnocythere posterolimba Delorme, 1967
Limnocythere pseudoreticulata Staplin, 1963
Limnocythere reticulata Sharpe, 1897
Limnocythere sanctipatricii Brady & D. Robertson, 1869
Limnocythere sappaensis Staplin, 1963
Limnocythere sharpei Staplin, 1963
Limnocythere staplini Gutentag & Benson, 1962
Limnocythere trapeziformis Staplin, 1963
Limnocythere varia Staplin, 1963
Limnocythere verrucosa Hoff, 1942

Literature
 Martens, K. & S. Savatenalinton, 2011. A subjective checklist of the Recent, free-living, non-marine Ostracoda (Crustacea). Zootaxa 2855: 1-79.

References

External links
 

Podocopida genera
Limnocytheridae
Taxonomy articles created by Polbot